Coleophora santolinella is a moth of the family Coleophoridae. It is found in Spain and on Corsica and Sardinia.

The larvae feed on Santolina chamaecyparissus. They create a lobe case of about 6 mm long. The case is covered by a large number of erect, brownish yellow, mined leaves. The mouth angle is 60-90°. Larvae can be found up to June.

References

santolinella
Moths of Europe
Moths described in 1890